"And Our Feelings" is the third single released from Babyface's album For the Cool in You.

Chart positions

Weekly charts

Year-end charts

References

Babyface (musician) songs
1993 songs
Songs written by Babyface (musician)
Songs written by Daryl Simmons
Song recordings produced by Babyface (musician)
Song recordings produced by L.A. Reid
Song recordings produced by Daryl Simmons
Epic Records singles